Menderes may refer to:

Geography and places in Turkey
 Menderes (Istanbul Metro), an underground rapid transit station
 Menderes, İzmir, a district of İzmir Province
 Büyük Menderes River, a river in southwestern Turkey, known in ancient times as Meander
 Adnan Menderes Airport, in İzmir
 Adnan Menderes Airport Rail Station, in southern Gaziemir
 Adnan Menderes University, in Aydın

People
 Surname
 Adnan Menderes (1899–1961), Turkish politician and prime minister, executed after a military coup
 Aydın Menderes (1946–2011), Turkish politician 
 Meral Menderes (1933–2011), Turkish opera singer as soprano

Given name
 Menderes Samancılar (born 1954), Turkish actor
 Menderes Türel (born 1964), Turkish politician of the Justice and Development Party (AKP)

Fictional characters
 Andeanna Menderes, a femme fatale in Lady of the Shades
 Mikis "The Turk" Menderes, a crime boss in Lady of the Shades

Turkish-language surnames
Turkish masculine given names